All for Latvia! was a right-wing ethnic nationalist political party in Latvia led by Raivis Dzintars and . Formed in 2000, it entered a right-wing nationalist coalition in 2010, and ultimately merged with the For Fatherland and Freedom/LNNK in 2011 to form the National Alliance.

History

All for Latvia! started in 2000 as a non-formal Latvian youth group with a nationalist disposition and became a social organization in 2002.

The organization became a political party in January 2006. For the 2010 elections for the Saeima, All for Latvia! joined forces in the National Alliance with the more established national conservative party For Fatherland and Freedom/LNNK to field a common list of candidates. At the election, the list won eight seats, six of them for All for Latvia!. Unity invited the electoral alliance of All for Latvia! and For Fatherland and Freedom/LNNK to join the coalition, but the offer was withdrawn a few says later after Society for Political Change, one of the parties making up Unity, vetoed such option.

On 23 July 2011, the For Fatherland and Freedom/LNNK Party and All for Latvia! merged to form the National Alliance.

In April 2013, All for Latvia! officially established cooperation ties with the Russian National Democratic Alliance.

Ideology

All for Latvia! supported making Latvian citizenship laws more restrictive, by introducing strict limits on the number of people who can be naturalized into Latvian citizenship in one year. All for Latvia! wanted to increase the percentage of ethnic Latvians in the country to at least 75%, by providing financial support to other ethnicities who would like to leave the country and ethnic Latvians from abroad who would like to return to Latvia. All for Latvia! supported a greater role for the Latvian language and proposed to make it the only language of instruction in publicly funded primary and secondary schools, starting from 2015. The party was opposed to European federalism.

All for Latvia! supported protectionist economic policies to increase the role of locally owned businesses. It was supportive of the traditional family, opposed to homosexuality, gambling and favours more restrictive regulation of alcohol sales. It believed that the common interests of the nation have a higher value than the interests of individual people.

Latvian political scientist Nils Muižnieks described All for Latvia! as racist in 2005. In April 2013, MEP from Harmony Centre Alexander Mirsky was found guilty by Riga District Court and ordered to pay damages to All for Latvia! and other National Alliance members for defamation by calling them "fascists".

Election results

References

External links
 

Latvian nationalism
All for Latvia
Nationalist parties in Latvia
Right-wing parties in Europe
Eurosceptic parties in Latvia
2000 establishments in Latvia
Political parties established in 2000